The Orowaiti River is a river of the West Coast Region of New Zealand's South Island. The smaller of the two rivers which run through the town of Westport, it reaches the Karamea Bight three kilometres to the east of its larger neighbour, the Buller River.

See also
List of rivers of New Zealand

References

Rivers of the West Coast, New Zealand
Buller District
Rivers of New Zealand